Strawberry is commonly the cultivated garden strawberry, Fragaria × ananassa.

Strawberry or Strawberries may also refer to:
Fragaria, the strawberry genus, or any of its species
Mock strawberry, the plant Potentilla indica

Places

Strawberry, Arizona
Strawberry, Arkansas
Strawberry, El Dorado County, California
Strawberry, Marin County, California
Strawberry, Tuolumne County, California, U.S.
Strawberry, Nevada, a ghost town
Strawberry, South Carolina
Strawberry, Utah
Strawberry Cirque, Antarctica
Strawberry Crater, Arizona, U.S.
Strawberry Creek, Berkeley, California, U.S.
Strawberry Field, a former children's home in Liverpool, England
Strawberry Hill (disambiguation), several places
Strawberry Island (Deception Pass, Washington), Island County, Washington, U.S.
Strawberry Island (Rosario Strait, Washington), Skagit County, Washington, U.S.
Strawberry Islands, Door County, Wisconsin, U.S.
Strawberry Lagoon, California, U.S.
Strawberry Line railway walk, U.K., a walkway along a former railway line and a model railway line
Strawberry Mountain (disambiguation), several peaks
Strawberry Peak, a mountain in California, U.S.
Strawberry Range, a mountain range in Oregon, U.S.
Strawberry Reservoir, Utah, U.S.
 Strawberry River (Arkansas), U.S.
 Strawberry River (Utah), U.S.
Strawberry Tree (disambiguation), several topics
Strawberry Valley, California, U.S.

People
Strawberry Saroyan, American journalist and author
Tamara Greene or Strawberry, exotic dancer

Family name
Darryl Strawberry (born 1962), American former baseball player
D. J. Strawberry, (born 1985), American-Cameroonian basketball player
Linda Strawberry, American artist, director, editor and musician

Art, entertainment, and media

Fictional characters
 Ichigo Kurosaki or Strawberry, in the manga series Bleach
 Ichigo Amano, in the manga series Yumeiro Pâtissière
 Strawberry Shortcake, franchised character appearing on greetings cards etc.
 "Strawberry", played by Tom Skeritt in Up In Smoke

Films
Strawberry (film), 2015 Tamil film

Music

Bands
 Strawberry (band), Canadian indie band formed in 1993

Companies
Strawberries, defunct American record store chain acquired by Trans World Entertainment
 Strawberry Studios, recording studio in Stockport, England

Albums
Strawberry (album), by Wussy
 Strawberries (album), 1982 album by the Damned
Strawberry (Epik High EP), 2023 EP by Epik High

Songs
 "Strawberries" (song), 1997 song by Smooth
 "Strawberry" (song), 1998 song by Nicole Renée* "Strawberries", by Asobi Seksu, 2007
 "Strawberries", by Girl from Sheer Greed, 1980
"Strawberries", by Jerry Butler from Folk Songs, 1963

Science and technology 
Strawberry (software), an audio player forked from Clementine (software)
Strawberry Perl, version of Perl programming language

Other uses
Strawberry (bus operator), a bus company in England

See also
Barren Strawberry (disambiguation)
Strawberry Fields (disambiguation)
Strawberry generation, Chinese sociological term
Strawberry land hermit crab (Coenobita perlatus), a species of terrestrial hermit crab often kept as pets
Strawberry mark or hemangioma, a type of birthmark
Team Strawberry, American cycling team used in scientific research
Wild Strawberries (disambiguation)

English-language surnames